John Scafe Jackson (1 October 1878 – 30 June 1954) was a South African international rugby union player who played as a forward.

He made one appearance for South Africa in 1903.

References

South African rugby union players
South Africa international rugby union players
1878 births
1954 deaths
Rugby union forwards
Western Province (rugby union) players